Inna Ivanovna Ulyanova (June 30, 1934 – June 9, 2005) was a Soviet and Russian film and stage actress, singer and comic character roles, Honored Artist of the RSFSR (1989), winner of the State Prize of Russian Federation (2000).

Biography 
Inna Ulyanova was born on June 30th, 1934 in Gorlovka to Ivan Ulyanov (1906–1991) and Anna Ulyanova-Kocherzhenko (1911–2007). In 1957, she graduated from the Boris Shchukin Theatre Institute.

From 1957 to 1963 she served in the Saint Petersburg Comedy Theatre, and in the Taganka Theatre from 1964 to 1993.

The actress died from cirrhosis of the liver on June 9th, 2005 in an ambulance. This led Ulyanvova's neighbors to not open the door to the apartment building for a week.  She is buried in the Vagankovo cemetery in Moscow.

Selected filmography
 1956 – Carnival Night
 1969 – Late Flowers
 1973 – Seventeen Moments of Spring
 1975/94 – Yeralash
 1976 – A Slave of Love
 1977/92 – Fitil
 1982 – The Pokrovsky Gate
 1984 –  Extend, Extend, Fascination...
 1985 – Do Not Marry, Girls
 1988 — Where is the Nophelet?
 1989 – How Dark the Nights Are on the Black Sea
 1994 – Burnt by the Sun

References

External links
 
 В кресле гостя Инна Ульянова

1934 births
2005 deaths
People from Horlivka
Soviet film actresses
Russian film actresses
State Prize of the Russian Federation laureates
Deaths from cirrhosis
Burials at Vagankovo Cemetery
Soviet stage actresses
Russian stage actresses
20th-century Russian actresses
Honored Artists of the RSFSR